Baptist Church, Yangzhou, locally known as Baptist Church, Xianliang Street and Chapel, Cuiyuan Road, is a Protestant church located in Guangling District of Yangzhou, Jiangsu, China.

History 
The church traces its origins to the former Lingquan Teahouse. The Southern Baptist Convention bought it in 1917 and reformed it as a church in 1923. During the Second Sino-Japanese War, the Imperial Japanese Army commandeered it and used it as a cinema and cafe house. The church was restored and redecorated in 1946. The church was closed during the ten-year Cultural Revolution. It was officially reopened to the public in 1981. In January 2008, it was designated as a municipal cultural relic preservation organ by the Yangzhou government.

References

Further reading 
 

Baptist churches in China
Churches in Yangzhou
Tourist attractions in Yangzhou
1923 establishments in China
Protestant churches in China
Churches completed in 1923